Whippletree (also as Whipple-tree and similar variations) may refer to:

Whippletree, a very old plant name for species of dogwood (see: Cornus (genus))
Whippletree (mechanism), a pivot mechanism used to distribute force evenly, used for draught animals and in windscreen (windshield) wipers